Flavin adenine dinucleotide synthetase 1 is a protein that in humans is encoded by the FLAD1 gene.

Function

This gene encodes the enzyme that catalyzes adenylation of flavin mononucleotide (FMN) to form flavin adenine dinucleotide (FAD) coenzyme. Alternatively spliced transcript variants encoding distinct isoforms have been observed.

References

Further reading 

Human proteins